Peterson Field (formerly 7A9) is a public-use airport located three nautical miles (6 km) northeast of the central business district of Plains, a city in Sumter County, Georgia, United States. It is privately owned by G. Thomas Peterson.

Facilities and aircraft 
It has one runway designated 18/36 with a 3,255 by 230 ft (992 x 70 m) turf surface. For the 12-month period ending April 26, 2000, the airport had 2,190 aircraft operations, an average of 183 per month, all of which were general aviation.

References

External links 
 

Airports in Georgia (U.S. state)
Buildings and structures in Sumter County, Georgia
Transportation in Sumter County, Georgia